is a park located in Ōta Ward, Tokyo.

References

Parks and gardens in Tokyo
1989 establishments in Japan
Bird parks
Urban public parks in Japan